Stenanthemum poicilum is a species of flowering plant in the family Rhamnaceae and is endemic to the south-west of Western Australia. It is an erect or low-lying shrub with hairy young stems, broadly egg-shaped leaves with the narrower end towards the base, and clusters of densely hairy white flowers.

Description
Both surfaces of the leaves are covered with tiny, star-shaped hairs.

Taxonomy and naming
Stenanthemum poicilum was first formally described in 1995 by Barbara Lynette Rye in the journal Nuytsia from specimens collected in 1992. The specific epithet (poicilum) means "mottled", referring to the seeds.

Distribution and habitat
This species grows in heath and shrubland near Canna and on the Bremer Range in the Avon Wheatbelt and Yalgoo bioregions of south-western Western Australia.

Conservation status
Stenanthemum poicilum is listed as "Priority Three" by the Government of Western Australia Department of Biodiversity, Conservation and Attractions, meaning that it is poorly known and known from only a few locations but is not under imminent threat.

References

poicilum
Rosales of Australia
Flora of Western Australia
Plants described in 1995
Taxa named by Barbara Lynette Rye